Masters of Rock, is a 2002 compilation album by Hawkwind covering the United Artists years 1970–75. There are two bonus live tracks from 2001.

Track listing
"Master of the Universe"
"Brainstorm"
"Motorhead"
"Sonic Attack"
"Lord of Light" - Single version
"Hurry on Sundown"
"Orgone Accumulator"
"Lost Johnny"
"Silver Machine" - Original single version
"Urban Guerilla"
"Mirror of Illusion"
"Paradox"
"Love in Space" - Previously unreleased 2001 live version
"Light House" - Previously unreleased 2001 live version

Release history
May 2002: EMI, 5 37765 2

References

Hawkwind compilation albums
2002 compilation albums